Geodorcus is a genus of beetles belonging to the family Lucanidae. They are endemic to New Zealand.
All Geodorcus species are protected under Schedule 7 of The 1953 Wildlife Act, making it an offense to hunt, kill or possess a specimen.

List of species
There are ten species:
  Geodorcus alsobius
 Geodorcus auriculatus
 Geodorcus capito
 Geodorcus helmsi
 Geodorcus ithaginis
 Geodorcus montivagus
 Geodorcus novaezealandiae
 Geodorcus philpotti
 Geodorcus servandus
 Geodorcus sororum

References

Lucanidae genera
Lucaninae
Beetles of New Zealand
Endemic fauna of New Zealand
Endemic insects of New Zealand